Páll Bragi Pétursson (17 March 1937 – 23 November 2020) was an Icelandic politician and former minister for social affairs from April 1995 to May 2003. He was President of the Nordic Council in 1985 and 1990.

External links 
 Non auto-biography of Páll Bragi Pétursson on the parliament website

1937 births
2020 deaths
Social Affairs ministers of Iceland
Pall Bragi Petursson